The flag of Kamchatka Krai, in the Russian Federation, is a horizontal bicolour of white and blue charged with an emblem. The emblem is a modification of the coat of arms of Kamchatka Krai: three snow-capped volcano peaks on the backdrop of a red sun framed by an ornament.

The flag was adopted on 17 February 2010 by the Legislative Assembly of Kamchatka Krai, and came into use 1 July 2010.

Before 2007, the territory that is now Kamchatka Krai was two federal subjects called Kamchatka Oblast and Koryak Autonomous Okrug and thus their respective flags were used instead.

References
Flags of the World

Flag
Flags of the federal subjects of Russia
Kamchatka Krai